Raymond Benjamin Mowe (July 12, 1889 – August 14, 1968) was a professional baseball player who played shortstop in five games for the 1913 Brooklyn Dodgers. Mowe had 9 at-bats, 1 hit, 1 strike out, 1 time hit by pitch and 2 sacrifice hits.
     
As shortstop defensively he had 7 put outs, 8 assists, 1 error and 1 double play which resulted in a .941 fielding average.
The regular shortstop for Brooklyn was Rabbit Maranville.

Coaching career
Mowe served as the head football coach (1919–1922), head basketball coach (1917–1923), and head baseball coach (1918–1923) at Earlham College.

Head coaching record

Football

References

External links
 
 

1889 births
1968 deaths
Major League Baseball shortstops
Brooklyn Superbas players
Earlham Quakers baseball coaches
Earlham Quakers football coaches
Earlham Quakers men's basketball coaches
Harrisburg Senators players
Indianapolis Indians players
Newark Bears (IL) players
Newark Indians players
Newark Newks players
Springfield Green Sox players
Springfield Reapers players
Troy Trojans (minor league) players
People from Rochester, Indiana
Coaches of American football from Indiana
Baseball players from Indiana
Basketball coaches from Indiana
Elgin Kittens players